Dianthus spiculifolius is a species of pink native to the Carpathians; Romania, Moldova and Ukraine. Occasionally grown in rock gardens, it is available from commercial suppliers.

References

spiculifolius
Flora of the Carpathians
Garden plants of Europe
Plants described in 1866